The 2014 Massachusetts gubernatorial election took place on November 4, 2014, to elect the Governor of Massachusetts, concurrently with the election of Massachusetts' Class II U.S. Senate seat, and other elections to the United States Senate in other states and elections to the United States House of Representatives and various state and local elections.

Incumbent Democratic Governor Deval Patrick was eligible to seek a third term but stated in January 2011 that he would not run for re-election. The office of lieutenant governor had been vacant since the resignation of Tim Murray in June 2013.

Primary elections for governor and lieutenant governor were conducted separately on September 9, 2014: the Democrats nominated Massachusetts Attorney General Martha Coakley and former CEO of the Democratic National Convention Steve Kerrigan, and the Republicans nominated former state cabinet secretary and 2010 gubernatorial nominee Charlie Baker and former state representative Karyn Polito.

Baker defeated Coakley and three other candidates in the general election.

Democratic primary

Governor

Candidates

Declared
 Donald Berwick, former Administrator of the Centers for Medicare and Medicaid Services and former president and CEO of the Institute for Healthcare Improvement
 Martha Coakley, Attorney General of Massachusetts and nominee for the U.S. Senate in 2010
 Steven Grossman, Treasurer and Receiver-General of Massachusetts, former chairman of the DNC and former chairman of the Massachusetts Democratic Party

Eliminated at convention
 Joseph Avellone, executive at PAREXEL, former COO of Blue Cross Blue Shield of Massachusetts and former chairman of the Wellesley Board of selectmen
 Juliette Kayyem, columnist, lecturer and former Assistant U.S. Secretary of Homeland Security for Intergovernmental Affairs

Withdrew
 Dan Wolf, state senator and CEO of Cape Air

Declined
 Suzanne M. Bump, Massachusetts State Auditor (running for re-election)
 Mike Capuano, U.S. Representative and candidate for the U.S. Senate in 2010 (running for re-election)
 Mo Cowan, former U.S. Senator
 Joseph Curtatone, Mayor of Somerville
 Robert DeLeo, Speaker of the Massachusetts House of Representatives
 Barney Frank, former U.S. Representative
 Therese Murray, President of the Massachusetts Senate
 Tim Murray, former Lieutenant Governor of Massachusetts and former Mayor of Worcester
 Carmen Ortiz, U.S. Attorney for the District of Massachusetts
 Deval Patrick, incumbent Governor of Massachusetts
 Rick Sullivan, chief of staff to Governor Deval Patrick, former Massachusetts Secretary of Energy and Environmental Affairs and former mayor of Westfield

Endorsements

Debates/forums
Complete video of forum, February 4, 2014

Polling

With Capuano and Coakley

Without Coakley

With Coakley and Murray

Results

Bold denotes candidate met the minimum threshold of fifteen percent to appear on the primary ballot.

Lieutenant governor

Candidates

Declared
 Leland Cheung, Cambridge city councilor and board member of the Massachusetts Technology Collaborative
 Steve Kerrigan, former CEO of the Democratic National Convention
 Michael Lake, candidate for state auditor in 2010

Eliminated at convention
 James Arena-DeRosa, former United States Department of Agriculture northeast administrator

Withdrew
 Jonathan Edwards, Whately Selectman

Polling

Results

Bold denotes candidate met the minimum threshold of 15 percent to appear on the primary ballot

Republican primary

Governor

Candidates

Declared
 Charlie Baker, former state cabinet secretary and nominee for governor in 2010
 Mark Fisher, businessman and Tea Party activist

Declined
 Scott Brown, former U.S. Senator (running for the U.S. Senate in New Hampshire)
 Gabriel E. Gomez, nominee for the U.S. Senate in 2013
 Karyn Polito, former state representative and nominee for state treasurer in 2010 (running for lieutenant governor)
 Richard Tisei, former State Senate Minority Leader, nominee for lieutenant governor in 2010 and nominee for MA-06 in 2012 (running for Congress)
 William Weld, former governor
 Daniel Winslow, former state representative and candidate for the U.S. Senate in 2013

Campaign
At the Republican State Convention on March 22, 2014, Baker received 2,095 votes (82.708%), businessman and Tea Party activist Mark Fisher received 374 votes (14.765%) and there were 64 blank votes (2.527%). The threshold for making the ballot is 15% and the Party announced that Baker had thus received the nomination without the need for a primary election. However, Fisher argued that according to the Convention Rules, blank votes are not counted for the purposes of determining the winner and that he thus received 15.148%, enough to make the ballot. He sued the Massachusetts Republican State Committee and his case was due to be heard in Suffolk Superior Court between May 2 and June 18.

The committee's lawyer, Louis M. Ciavarra, said that in negotiations with the committee, Fisher declined their offer of being placed on the ballot, and instead asked for $1 million in return for dropping the suit. Ciavarra said that after it was pointed out to Fisher and his representatives that this would be illegal, they allegedly lowered their request to $650,000. Fisher's lawyer, Thomas M. Harvey, has confirmed that Fisher had asked for $1 million, which he called a "starting point", saying that Fisher should be "compensated" for his efforts, in addition to receiving a place on the ballot. He later said that the request for $650,000 was "still negotiable" and added that "you don't ask for what you expect". Fisher himself has denied asking for a "payoff", instead saying that party officials had offered him a "bribe" in December 2013 in return for dropping out. He refused to say who made the offer, claiming to have been under a gag order, though no such order existed. He said that he only asked for $1 million during the negotiations because he had been asked for a figure and it was the sum that he claimed the party had offered to him. He further denied the claim that he had offered to withdraw in exchange for the money, saying that he wanted a place on the ballot, for the State Committee to release the "tally sheets" which he claims show that he rightfully won a place on the ballot, and to be reimbursed $100,000 in damages: for the cost of legal fees and of collecting signatures to make the ballot by petition.

On May 9, 2014, a week into the case, Judge Douglas Wilkins accepted the State Committee's offer to certify Fisher on the primary ballot and put off the expedited June 16 trial date. The State Committee had not at that point turned over the "tally sheets" and the judge did not order them to do so, instead inviting Fisher's attorneys to submit an amended complaint. The State Committee also asked that the trial, discovery and deliberation over damages be postponed until after the election. The judge did not rule on that request, but he did rule that the other portions of Fisher's complaint would proceed at a later date, with no need for an expedited trial before the primary.

A debate was held between Baker and Fisher on August 21. They clashed on jobs, gun control and higher education. Baker called for "constructive friction" in electing him governor to counterbalance the Democratic-controlled General Court and said that he would "clean up the regulatory morass, control spending [and] reduce taxes." Fisher criticised the rise in food stamps, rising cost of entitlement programmes and illegal immigration. In the primary election on September 9, Baker defeated Fisher 116,004 votes (74.1%) to 40,240 (25.7%). In February 2015, Fisher settled with the State Party for $240,000. Executive Director Brian Wynne said that despite the settlement, the Party denied his accusations and said that the settlement was forced on them because of mounting legal costs.

Polling

Results

Lieutenant governor

Candidates

Declared
 Karyn Polito, former state representative and nominee for Treasurer and Receiver-General of Massachusetts in 2010

Independents and third parties

Candidates

Declared
 Evan Falchuk, healthcare executive, attorney and founder of the United Independent Party
Running mate: Angus Jennings, professional planner/consultant
 Scott Lively, evangelical pastor
Running mate: Shelly Saunders
 Jeff McCormick, co-founder and managing partner of venture capital firm Saturn Partners
Running mate: Tracy Post, member of the Yarmouth Board of Selectmen

General election

Debates
Complete video of debate, October 7, 2014 - C-SPAN
Complete video of debate, October 21, 2014 - C-SPAN
Complete video of debate, October 27, 2014 - C-SPAN

Predictions

Polling

With Avellone

With Berwick

With Capuano

With Coakley

With Cowan

With Galvin

With Grossman

With Kayyem

With Kennedy

With Murray

With Ortiz

With Wolf

Results

Results by county

Results by Congressional district
Baker won 6 of the 9 congressional districts.

See also
 2014 Massachusetts general election
 2013–2014 Massachusetts legislature
 2014 United States gubernatorial elections

References

External links
Massachusetts gubernatorial election, 2014 at Ballotpedia

Official campaign websites (Archived)
Charlie Baker
Martha Coakley
Don Berwick
Joe Avellone
Evan Falchuk
Mark Fisher
Seth Grossman
Scott Lively
Juliette Kayyem
Jeff McCormick

Gubernatorial
2014
Massachusetts